Department of Revenue and Disaster Management, Haryana is a Ministry and department of the Government of Haryana in India.

Description
This department came into existence when Haryana was established as a new state within India after being separated from Punjab.  Dushyant Chautala is the minister responsible for this department from November 2019.

The department is organised in six divisions, 22 districts, 71 sub-divisions, 93 Tehsils and 49 Sub-Tehsils, 256 Kanungo circles, 2691 Patwar circles and 7088 revenue circles corresponding to villages. The department is responsible for disaster management, revenue collection, and administration of the Unique Identification (UID).

Address - New Secretariat Haryana, Sector-17, Chandigarh

See also
 Government of Haryana

References

Revenue and Disaster Management
Emergency management in India